Jens Christian Ludvig Pedersen Andersen (10 December 1896 – 29 July 1982) was a Danish sports shooter. He competed in two events at the 1920 Summer Olympics.

References

External links
 

1896 births
1982 deaths
Danish male sport shooters
Olympic shooters of Denmark
Shooters at the 1920 Summer Olympics
People from Guldborgsund Municipality
Sportspeople from Region Zealand